Kofi Owusu Dua Anto (born 15 December 1978), known mononymously as KODA, is a Ghanaian Gospel singer, songwriter, record producer and multi-instrumentalist from Takoradi.

Early life and education
KODA fell in love with musical instruments at a tender age. His mother enrolled him in a music class at the age of 10 where he developed his skills to play the guitar. He went to the Kwame Nkrumah University of Science and Technology (KNUST) where he became the mass choir director of the university.

KODA was also the music director and instrumentalist of the "Music Wing of Baptist Students Union", "KNUST's Simply Jazz Crew", "God's Instruments" and a leading member of "Da Project" which was a legendary Ghanaian contemporary gospel group then.

Music career
After tertiary education, he co-wrote, mixed, mastered and produced the exceptional album, Awurade Ei for KNUST's "God's Instruments" at KODED studios, Takoradi, Ghana. The album received massive recognition in the country. It had great hits such as "Awurade Ei" ("Se Woma Wonsa Soa"), "Tumi" and "Onyame" Ye D'awase".

He also worked on Nii Okai's Moko Be and Gye W'ayeyi albums which actually blew him up as a producer.

KODA has worked with many gospel artists in and out of Ghana including the likes of Nii Okai, "Pastor Joseph Gyebi", Danny Nettey, Pastor Joe Beecham, "Daughters of Glorious Jesus", "Joyful Way Inc.", Pastor Helen Yawson, Yaw Osei-Owusu, "Ike Nanor", Eugene Zuta, Jesse Jenkins, Diana Hamilton and Calvis Hammond, among others.

KODA and "The Anointed"
The Anointed is a music group formed by KODA and his friends based in Takoradi. The group has supported many gospel ministries in the country and overseas.

KODA currently has four vocal and two gospel jazz albums to his credit. "Nyame Beye" which is the first and "Waye Wie" which had hits including "Waye Wie", 'Zion's song', "Poma", 'Amen' and others. His third album "Black & White" had many hits like; 'Guide Me O', "Nkwa Abodoo", "Obiara Nte Se Wo", including the controversial single, "Nsem Pii". In 2016, he released an album "OXYGEN" which featured songs such as "Adooso" , "Yaa Pae" and "Chimo".

In 2021, he released his 6th vocal album ('Keteke').

As a music tutor, he released a two instructional DVD on bass and lead guitar and also 3 live DVDs of  his major concerts;'KODA live 2008', Black and White live 2013' and 'Oxygen Live 2016"

Personal life
KODA is married to Ewurama Dua Anto, who also sings. They currently have 3 children (2 sons and a daughter).

Discography

Albums

Major Singles
 Nkwaa Abodoo featuring Nacy
 Nsem Pii
 Adooso

Awards and nominations

References

External links
 Official Facebook Page
 KODA on Twitter

Living people
21st-century Ghanaian male singers
21st-century Ghanaian singers
Ghanaian gospel singers
People from Western Region (Ghana)
1978 births
Ghanaian composers
Kwame Nkrumah University of Science and Technology alumni
Mfantsipim School alumni
Ghanaian Christians